Tega Cay is a planned city in York County, South Carolina, United States, located west of Fort Mill and north of Rock Hill. It is a suburb of Charlotte, North Carolina. The population was recorded at 7,621 as of the 2010 U.S. Census.

Tega Cay is located on a peninsula along Lake Wylie, twenty miles south of Charlotte. The name Tega Cay allegedly comes from an unknown Polynesian language and means "Beautiful Peninsula", however, this is unconfirmed.

Geography and climate
Tega Cay is located at  (35.037262, -81.024644). According to the United States Census Bureau, the city has a total area of 3.2 square miles (8.2 km2), of which 2.5 square miles (6.4 km2) is land and 0.7 square mile (1.7 km2) (21.27%) is water. The city has 13 mi (21 km) of shoreline. Tega Cay's ZIP code is 29708 and the area code is 803. The hilly terrain is densely forested, containing many species of hardwoods and pines, and wildlife. Recreational facilities located in Tega Cay include a public 27-hole, award winning golf course with a clubhouse and pavilion, a croquet court, and seven lighted tennis courts, two lighted pickleball courts, several miles of walking trails, and thirteen city owned parks of which three have baseball and/or soccer fields available for public use.  Two of the parks are lake side and the City owns swimming pool facility (membership only) that is also adjacent to Lake Wylie.  Along with those lakeside amenities, there is a privately owned marina, and three areas to launch boats. The City is currently engineering and fundraising for a 62-acre park for passive and active recreation along the Catawba River.  Included at that park will be miles of walking trails, four baseball/softball diamonds, six youth soccer fields, inclusive playgrounds, an amphitheater and a paddle boat launch onto the river just below the Lake Wylie hydro-electric dam.  The climate of Tega Cay is that of a Humid subtropical climate, which is characterized by hot, humid summers and cool, dry winters. Snow falls 3-4 times a year on average.

Government

Tega Cay is run under a council–manager government framework. The City Manager is chief executive position in this form of Government. The Council of Tega Cay is composed of four members plus the Mayor who serves as a member of Council, selected from at-large districts. The city maintains its own Police Department, Fire Department, Parks & Recreation Department, Development Services Department, Utilities Department (water & waste water) and Public Works Department. Other positions in the town include Assistant City Manager, Finance Director, Municipal Clerk, Clerk of Court, Planning & Development Manager, Building Inspectors, and administrative staff.

The City has a Fire Department with an ISO rating of 2. Several other governmental positions in the town, including the Beautification Committee, the Planning Commission, the Storm Water Committee and the Board of Zoning Appeals, are all staffed by volunteers as well. Based on the mini-cities concept, trash collection, curbside recycling, repaving and similar requirements are contracted out. The fiscal year runs from October 1 through September 30.

Demographics

2020 census

As of the 2020 United States census, there were 12,832 people, 3,531 households, and 3,013 families residing in the city.

2000 census
As of the census of 2000, there were 4,044 people, 1,509 households, and 1,228 families residing in the city. The population density was 1,630 people per square mile (629.6/km2). There were 1,577 housing units at an average density of 635.7 per square mile (245.5/km2). The racial makeup of the city was 95.87% White, 2.13% African American, 0.82% Asian, 0.12% Native American, 0.10% Pacific Islander, 0.37% from other races, and 0.59% from two or more races. Hispanic or Latino within any race were 0.91% of the population.

There were 1,509 households, out of which 37.6% had children under the age of 18 living with them, 74.6% were married couples living together, 5.2% had a female householder with no husband present, and 18.6% were non-families. 15.0% of all households were made up of individuals, and 4.0% had someone living alone who was 65 years of age or older. The average household size was 2.68 and the average family size was 2.99.

In the city, the population was spread out, with 26.8% under the age of 18, 4.3% from 18 to 24, 29.1% from 25 to 44, 30.6% from 45 to 64, and 9.2% who were 65 years of age or older. The median age was 40 years. For every 100 females, there were 93.4 males. For every 100 females age 18 and over, there were 93.8 males.

The median income for a household in the city was $80,227, and the median income for a family was $82,926. Males had a median income of $61,745 versus $35,082 for females. The per capita income for the city was $37,275. About 1.3% of families and 1.2% of the population were below the poverty line, including 2.1% of those under age 18 and none of those age 65 or over.

Students attend Fort Mill schools, which are located nearby and are considered among the best in the state.

See also
 Lake Wylie, South Carolina
 Fort Mill, South Carolina
 South Carolina

References

External links

 Tega Cay, South Carolina home page

Cities in South Carolina
Cities in York County, South Carolina
South Carolina populated places on the Catawba River